Isterband (Swedish: "lard-strips") is a coarsely ground, lightly smoked sausage from Sweden. It is made of pork, barley groats and potato. There are many varieties of isterband in Swedish cuisine, such as "småländska isterband" from the region of Småland, "syrliga isterband" with a slightly sour taste, and "lättisterband" with a low calorie content. Isterband is often served together with creamed dill potatoes and pickled beetroot.

See also
 Falukorv
 List of sausages
 List of smoked foods

References

Swedish sausages
Smoked meat